Ptychobela baynhami is a species of sea snail, a marine gastropod mollusk in the family Pseudomelatomidae, the turrids and allies.

Description
The length of the shell attains 29 mm, its diameter 9 mm.

Like Ptychobela suturalis (Gray, 1838), this fusiform, turreted species has a raised fillet at the suture. But it may be distinguished by its shorter body whorl, its more pronounced ribs, and the difference of colour.  The shell contains 12 whorls; the first two are smooth and globose. The subsequent whorls are concave above the middle and convex below. The ribs (in the penultimate whorl 9–10) become obsolete a little above the middle of the whorls where the concavity commences, and, being traversed by a distinct tenuous white spiral thread, have a somewhat angulated appearance. The aperture measures 2/5th of the total length. The inner part of the aperture is livid. The columella is slightly arcuate and has a minute callus.

Distribution
This marine species occurs in the Indian Ocean off Aden and Somalia

References

 Abrard (R.), 1941 Mollusques pleistocènes de la Côte française des Somalis, recueillis par E. Aubert de la Rüe. Archives du Muséum National d'Histoire Naturelle, sér. 6, t. 18, pp. 5–105

External links
 
 Gastropods.com: Ptychobela baynhami

baynhami
Gastropods described in 1891